Sound of Home is the sixth studio album from the Young Voices Brandenburg on the Junge Töne label.  The concept for the CD focuses on popular repertoire relating the questions "Where I come from, where I belong and where I feel at home".

Background 

The concept of the Sound of Home CD came from director Marc Secara in asking the questions "Where I come from, where I belong and where I feel at home". The repertoire chosen for the album was closely coordinated with 7 arrangers Secara trusted to write cover versions of hit tunes dating back to Antônio Carlos Jobims 1959 composition Chega de Saudade and the tradition Germany folksong Schlaflied.   The program for the CD comes all the way forward to songs made popular by more recently artists such as Michael Bublé, Johannes Oerding, and Melody Gardot.  Original material from within the ensemble is also included on the release.

Track listing

Recording sessions 
 February 17–21, 2016 - Greve Studio, Berlin, Germany

Personnel

Musicians 

 Conductor: Marc Secara
 Soprano I (female voice): Amelie Schreiber, Josephine Lichel, Karoline Weidt, Sara Spellerberg, Laura Fellhauer
 Soprano II (female voice): Elisabeth Hannah, Laura Fellhauer, Mirijam Olbrich, Susann Schüler 
 Alto I (female voice): Viktoria Anton, Julenka Werkmeister, Nina Berck, Tina May, Charlotte Haselon
 Alto II (female voice): Domii R Rose, Mai Linh, Lucy Castle, Josephine Lichel, Susann Students
 Tenor (male voice): Marius Berg, Mico Wuppermann, Sebastian Sanchez, René Großerüschkamp
 Bass (male voice): Niklas Lukassen, Willy Tschusch, Stefan Intemann
 Harmonica: Harry Ermer 
 Guitar: James Scholfield
 Piano/keyboards: Nicolai Thärichen
 Bass: Niklas Lukassen
 Drums/Congas/Percussion: Kai Schoenburg

Production 

 Producer, conductor, editor-engineer: Marc Secara
 Editing: Metropolitan Music Studio, Berlin
 Producer, engineer: Silvio Naumann
 Assistant-producer/English language consultant: Jack Cooper
 Digital mastering: Silvio Naumann 
 Production assistant: Steffi Garke
 Liner Notes: Marc Secara
 Cover art and design: Stefan Matzdorf

Promotion 

Performance and premiere of the Sound of Home, June 5, 2016 in Berlin Germany at the Heimathafen Neukölln Theatre.   A special feature with RBB Kulturradio was broadcast on Saturday, June 4 at 7:10 a.m ("Das Porträt" program) about the "Sound of Home" CD and the release.  A tour of the state of Brandenburg was used to promote and the CD through the Summer of 2016; first touring July 30 through August 11.   The tour for Sound of Home is featured on a RBB television special (was first aired on September 22, 2016).

Release history

See also
Deutscher Musikrat
Jack Cooper
Marc Secara
Young Voices Brandenburg

References

External links
 
 
 

Young Voices Brandenburg
Greve Studio, Berlin
Heimatsuche ('Sound of Home' documentary) on the RBB network

2016 albums
Young Voices Brandenburg albums